MA Malek is a Bangladeshi journalist who is currently the editor of the first daily Azadi of independent Bangladesh. The Government of Bangladesh awarded him the Ekushey Padak in Journalism in 2022 for his significant contribution in journalism.

Career 
MA Malek has been a journalist since the publication of the daily Azadi on September 5, 1960. He has been the editor of the daily Azadi since 2003. He is the former president of Chittagong Press Club, president of Chittagong Newspaper Council, Chittagong Editors Council, Chittagong Club and Chittagong Seniors Club.

The Government of Bangladesh awarded him the Ekushey Padak in Journalism in 2022 for his significant contribution in journalism.

Award 
 Ekushey Padak- 2022

References 

Recipients of the Ekushey Padak
Bangladeshi journalists
People from Chittagong District
Living people
Year of birth missing (living people)